Giordana Angi (born 12 January 1994) is an italian-French singer, songwriter and music producer.

She debuted in the "Newcomers" section at the Sanremo Music Festival 2012 with the song "Incognita poesia". In 2019 she ended up second in the eighteenth edition of the Italian talent show Amici di Maria De Filippi.

In 2019 she signed a recording contract with Universal Music Italia, releasing two studio albums and several singles, including "Casa" and "Come mia madre",which she competed with at the Sanremo Music Festival 2020.

As a songwriter and lyricist she wrote songs for Nina Zilli, Tiziano Ferro, Alessandra Amoroso and Alberto Urso. In 2022, she founded 21co, a record label affiliated with Fascino PGT.

Biography and career 
In 2012 Angi  participated in the Sanremo Giovani's contest with the song "Incognita poesia".

In 2016 she released her first single "Chiusa con te (XXX)" for the label Sugar Music produced by Tiziano Ferro.

In 2018 she wrote the single sung in Sanremo by Nina Zilli, "Senza appartenere". In October 2018 Angi joined the talent show of Amici di Maria De Filippi, ranking in second place and winning the TIM Journalist Critics' Award. During Amici, she published numerous singles, later included in the EP, Casa, which debuted in second place in the FIMI chart and sold over 25,000 copies. The lead single, "Casa" peaked at number 44 of Italian Singles Chart and received the Gold certification.

On October 11, 2019, Angi published her first studio album, Voglio essere tua, became her first number one work on Fimi's chart, becoming the first woman to achieve this in 2019. The album tracks include the promotional single, "Stringimi più forte", certified Gold, and the collaboration "Oltre Mare" with Alberto Urso, winner of Amici. In 2019 she wrote songs with Tiziano Ferro, including "Accetto miracoli" and "Buona (cattiva) sorte",  Alberto Urso and Carmen Ferreri.

After being the coach of Amici Celebrities, the celebrities version of Amici, on December 31, 2019 her participation in the Sanremo Music Festival was announced, with the song "Come mia madre", later peaking at number 55 of Italian Singles Chart. 

In May 2020 she was selected for new talent show "Amici Speciali" with the single "Amami adesso". Her second studio album Mi muovo was publisched on 13 May, 2020, and peaked at number 11 on Italian Album Chart. From the album were taken out as singles "Siccome sei", "Farfalle", and "Tuttapposto" with Loredana Bertè.

In 2020 she wrote the songs "0 passi" and "Mentre ti spoglio" by the 20th edition finalist of Amici di Maria De Filippi Deddy, supervising and producing part of his debut album. During the year she also wrote the song "Il nostro tempo" for Alessandra Amoroso's album Tutto accade. Angi also participated as a judge for the initial casting of the 21st edition of Amici di Maria De Filippi and collaborated throughout the program as a tutor and singing coach.

In 2022, she founded 21co, a record label, together with Mamo Giovenco, Emanuela Sempio, Gabriele Costanzo. singer Briga, and Fascino PGT. Angi serves as the label's A&r.

Discography

Studio albums

Extended plays

Singles

Authorship and songwriting

Tv programs 

 Sanremo Giovani (Rai 1, 2012) - contestant
 Amici di Maria De Filippi (Canale 5, 2018-2019) - contestant - second place
 Amici Celebrities (Canale 5, 2019) - coach
 Sanremo Music Festival (Rai 1, 2020) - contestant
 Amici Speciali (Canale 5, 2020) - contestant

References

External links

Italian pop singers
Living people
21st-century Italian singers
1994 births
21st-century Italian women singers
Italian singer-songwriters